Beverly Hills is a city in McLennan County, Texas, United States. The population was 1,878 at the 2020 census. The city is surrounded by Waco and is part of the Waco Metropolitan Statistical Area.

Geography

Beverly Hills is located at  (31.520916, –97.154571).

Demographics

As of the 2020 United States census, there were 1,878 people, 645 households, and 489 families residing in the city.

At the 2000 census there were 2,113 people in 769 households, including 541 families, in the city. The population density was 3,252.8 people per square mile (1,255.1/km2). There were 814 housing units at an average density of 1,253.1 per square mile (483.5/km2).  The racial makeup of the city was 61.76% White, 10.70% African American, 0.43% Native American, 0.47% Asian, 24.42% from other races, and 2.22% from two or more races. Hispanic or Latino of any race were 44.30%.

Of the 769 households 34.2% had children under the age of 18 living with them, 53.1% were married couples living together, 12.9% had a female householder with no husband present, and 29.6% were non-families. 24.8% of households were one person and 11.2% were one person aged 65 or older. The average household size was 2.74 and the average family size was 3.29.

The age distribution was 29.1% under the age of 18, 12.0% from 18 to 24, 27.9% from 25 to 44, 18.9% from 45 to 64, and 12.2% 65 or older. The median age was 31 years. For every 100 females, there were 103.4 males. For every 100 females age 18 and over, there were 94.9 males.

The median household income was $29,896 and the median family income was $35,119. Males had a median income of $25,911 versus $18,718 for females. The per capita income for the city was $12,473. About 10.9% of families and 12.8% of the population were below the poverty line, including 14.4% of those under age 18 and 9.3% of those age 65 or over.

Education
The City of Beverly Hills is served by the Waco Independent School District.

References

Cities in McLennan County, Texas
Cities in Texas
Enclaves in the United States